Ejan may refer to:

Places 
 Ayjan, Markazi Province, Iran
 Ejan, Ghana

People 
 Ejan Mackaay (born 1943), Canadian legal scholar